The Spasskaya Tower, translated as 'Saviour Tower', is the main tower on the eastern wall of the Moscow Kremlin which overlooks Red Square.

History
The Spasskaya Tower was built in 1491 by the Italian architect Pietro Antonio Solari. Initially, it was named the Frolovskaya Tower after the Church of Frol and Lavr in the Kremlin, which is no longer there. The tower's modern name comes from the icon of 'Spas Nerukotvorny' translated as 'The Saviour Not Made by Hands', which was placed above the gates on the inside wall in 1658 and removed in 1917. The tower is also named for the wall-painted icon of 'Spas Smolensky' translated as 'Smolensky Saviour', which was created in the 16th century on the outside wall of the tower, plastered over in 1937, but reopened and restored in 2010.

The Spasskaya Tower was the first tower of the many Moscow Kremlin Towers to be crowned with the hipped roof in 1624–1625 by architects Bazhen Ogurtsov and Christopher Galloway (a Scottish architect and clock maker). According to a number of historical accounts, the clock on the Spasskaya Tower appeared between 1491 and 1585. It is usually referred to as the Kremlin chimes (Кремлёвские куранты) and designates official Moscow Time. The gate of Spasskaya Tower was used to greet foreign dignitaries, and was also used during formal ceremonies or processions held on Red Square.

Reverence and respect for the Tsar
The tower gate was once the main entrance into the Kremlin. In tsarist times, anyone passing through the gates had to remove their headgear, crossing themselves and dismount their horses. This practice was revived after the Icon of the Saviour was restored in 2010, but ceremonially.

"The Russians have always regarded the Spasskaya Tower with great reverence. According to old legends, the tower was possessed with miraculous powers and was reputed to protect the Kremlin from enemy invasion. People passing through the gates would always observe the custom of crossing themselves and doffing their hats to show their respect, and horses passing under the gates of the tower were said to shy. In fact, legend has it that Napoleon himself could not prevent his horse from taking fright as he rode through the gates, having failed to show his respect, and the French Emperor's hat was said to have fallen from his head."

The Spasskaya Tower was commissioned to be built by Ivan III, or Ivan the Great, the leader of the Grand Duchy of Moscow, and the grandfather of Ivan the Terrible.

Soviet Union and modern day uses
After the rise of the Soviet Union, in 1936 Joseph Stalin replaced the two-headed eagle on top of the Spasskaya Tower with a red star because he wanted to remove all evidence of the former Tsarist period. The star rotates in 360°. The height of the tower with the star is 71 meters.

The tradition of dismounting the horse and removing the cap ended during the Soviet era, when the Kremlin became the center of government and politics. Cars approached the gate head on from the Lobnoye Mesto and the road beside the GUM department store. All other traffic was routed through the Borovitsky gate.

Various cathedrals were demolished throughout the years to make room for other government buildings. It was not until 1955 during the rule of Nikita Khrushchev that the Kremlin was reopened to foreign visitors; the Kremlin was turned into a museum in 1961 and added to the World Heritage List in 1990. The daughter of Soviet cosmonaut Yuri Gagarin is the current director of the Kremlin Museums, Elena Gagarina. There are many cathedrals inside the Kremlin walls, and many of them hold church services, however irregularly because the cathedrals are still operated as museums.

The Spasskaya Gate posed an issue following in the 1990s, as the passage of vehicles disrupted the flow of pedestrians to GUM and other shopping centers. In 1999, the decision was made to finally close the gate to all traffic. The signal lights and guard platforms still remain. The gate is used occasionally when repairs must be made to the Borovissky Gate. However, in that case, all traffic is routed from Vasilyevsky Spusk. Nowadays, the gate opens to receive the presidential motorcades on inauguration day, for the WWII Victory Day parades, and to receive the New Year's tree.

In August 2014, Russian president Vladimir Putin suggested an idea for restoring Ascension Convent and Chudov Monastery, which were demolished by the Soviet regime in the 1930s. However, due to archaeological work which began in December 2015 and the lack of UNESCO's approval of the restoration, the restoration of Ascension Convent is currently unplanned. During archaeological work, experts have managed to find a foundation of Chudov Monastery and Ascension Convent.

Spasskaya Tower is also the honorific for the International Military Music Festival "Spasskaya Tower"., which is based within the grounds of Red Square.

In August 2010 the icon of Smolensk Saviour was uncovered and restored above the gate (see picture below). This begins the tradition of the parade inspector to remove his headgear and cross himself before the inspection of troops during all Moscow Victory Day Parades.

Beginning in 2016, there has been an hourly guard mounting ceremony by the Kremlin Regiment within the area of the gate.

Inscription on Spasskaya Gate
On top of the gates of Spasskaya Tower, there appears the following inscription (it is inscribed in Latin):

In Latin:
IOANNES VASILII DEI GRATIA MAGNUS DUX VOLODIMERIÆ, MOSCOVIÆ, NOVOGARDIÆ, TFERIÆ, PLESCOVIÆ, VETICIÆ, ONGARIÆ, PERMIÆ, BUOLGARIÆ ET ALIAS TOTIUSQUE RAXIE DOMINUS, ANNO 30 IMPERII SUI HAS TURRES CONDERE FECIT ET STATUIT PETRUS ANTONIUS SOLARIUS MEDIOLANENSIS ANNO NATIVIT ATIS DOMINI 1491 KALENDIS MARTIIS IUSSIT PONERE.

In English: 
Ivan Vasiliyevich, by the grace of God the Grand Duke of Vladimir, Moscow, Novgorod, Tver, Pskov, Vyatka, Yugra, Perm, Bulghar, and for other reasons that of all of Raxis, the year of 30 their government, these towers he did [commission] a Pietro Antonio Solari of Milan in the first of March, in the year of the Lord 1491.

Notes

Sources

External links 

 Moscow Kremlin Museum
 Website of President of Russia
 Spasskaya Tower on Rusarh.ru
 Clock of Spasskaya Tower

Buildings and structures completed in 1491
Towers completed in the 15th century
Red Square
Moscow Kremlin
Towers in Moscow
Moscow Kremlin towers
Clock towers in Russia
Cultural heritage monuments of federal significance in Moscow